The Duke Ellington Memorial by Robert Graham is installed at Duke Ellington Circle in Manhattan, New York City, New York. The monument depicts Duke Ellington at a piano, supported by three columns depicting three caryatids each, known as his nine muses. It was cast in 1997 and dedicated on July 1 of that year. Pianist Bobby Short conceived of the memorial in 1979; it was the first statue erected in Ellington's honor in the country.

References

1997 establishments in New York City
1997 sculptures
Bronze sculptures in Manhattan
Cultural depictions of Duke Ellington
Harlem
Monuments and memorials in Manhattan
Musical instruments in art
Outdoor sculptures in Manhattan
Sculptures in Central Park
Sculptures of African Americans
Sculptures of men in New York City
Statues in New York City